Frau Eva  is a 1916 German silent drama film directed by Robert Wiene and starring Erna Morena, Emil Jannings and Theodor Loos. It was based on the 1874 novel Fromont and Risler by Alphonse Daudet. The film was Jannings' first starring role, his previous appearance having been as an extra in Im Schützengraben.

Plot 

An ambitious wife spends all of her husband's hard-earned money and then commits suicide out of remorse.

Cast
 Erna Morena - Eva 
 Emil Jannings   
 Theodor Loos   
 Margarete Kupfer   
 Alexander Antalffy

References

Bibliography
 Jung, Uli & Schatzberg, Walter. Beyond Caligari: The Films of Robert Wiene. Berghahn Books, 1999.

External links

1916 films
Films of the German Empire
German silent feature films
German drama films
Films directed by Robert Wiene
Films based on French novels
Films based on works by Alphonse Daudet
1916 drama films
German black-and-white films
Silent drama films
1910s German films
1910s German-language films